The Hornell Dodgers (previously the Hornell Maples and Hornell Maple Leafs) was a minor league baseball team based in Hornell, New York that played in the Pennsylvania–Ontario–New York League  between 1942 and 1957.

Previously, Hornell teams played as members of the Southern Tier League (1904–1905) and Interstate League (1906, 1914–1915) after the first Hornell team played as members of the 1890 Western New York League.

After the team disbanded in 1956, the Bradford Beagles disbanded on May 23, 1957 and were replaced on May 28, 1957 by the Hornell Redlegs.

Notable alumni

 Tommy Davis (1956) 3x MLB All-Star; 2x NL Batting Title (1962-1963)
 Charlie Neal (1950) 3x MLB All-Star
 Phil Seghi (1947)
 Maury Wills (1951-1952) 7x MLB All-Star; 1962 NL Most Valuable Player
 Frankie Zak (1942) MLB All-Star
 Don Zimmer (1950) 2x MLB All-Star; 1989 NL Manager of the Year

References

External links
Hornell - Baseball Reference

Baseball teams established in 1942
Baseball teams disestablished in 1957
Defunct minor league baseball teams
Brooklyn Dodgers minor league affiliates
Boston Red Sox minor league affiliates
Cincinnati Reds minor league affiliates
Pittsburgh Pirates minor league affiliates
Professional baseball teams in New York (state)
1942 establishments in New York (state)
1957 disestablishments in New York (state)
Defunct baseball teams in New York (state)
Hornell, New York